The Braque du Bourbonnais is a breed of gundog, of rustic appearance, sometimes born with a short tail, with a coat ticked with liver, fawn, or white

History

Origins 

It had been described for the first time during the Renaissance (Natural History from Aldrovandi, Bibliothèque Nationale, Paris). In danger of disappearing, it thrived again after World War I with the creation of the first club, in 1925.

Disappearance 
After World War II, the number of births decreased and the club became less active until it ceased to function. From 1963 to 1973, there were no dogs registered in the LOF (French studbook). The reason for this is probably a selection on secondary characteristics (color of the coat, short tail) instead of the hunting capabilities and general construction of the dog; this led to have a Bourbonnais less suitable for hunting than other breeds.

Recreation 
In 1970, Michel Comte decided to look for the last dog that had some Bourbonnais blood. He found only mixed breed dogs, which had some characteristics of the Braque du Bourbonnais (size, shape of the head, short tail). After some more or less inbred litters, he registered his first Bourbonnais on the LOF (under Titre Initial procedure) in 1973, 1974, and 1975; from then, several breeders joined him, who, from those dogs, created their own lines, and the number of births increased.,

In 1981, the Club du Braque du Bourbonnais was recreated. Michel Comte was its president until 2001. From this moment, the successes of the Bourbonnais in field trials made the breed thrive.

In 1988, the first Bourbonnais was introduced in the USA. Since then the breed has been growing in that country, which became the second producer of Bourbonnais pointers after France.

Description

Appearance

Head 
Rounded in every direction, with lateral sides rounded, with parietal bones and zygomatic arches well developed. The axes of the skull and muzzle are parallel, or slightly divergent towards the front.

Coat 
Two coat colors exist in the Bourbonnais, each of them having specific name because the color is specific to the breed:
-Liver, also called « wine dregs » or « faded lilac ».
-Fawn, also called « peach blossom ».
Big spots are tolerated on the body if they are not bigger than the palm of a hand. On the head, the two eyes must not be inside the same spot.

Differences sire/Female 
The females are generally thinner, more elegant and longer than the sires (see pictures above).

Short tail 
In the past called "short-tail pointer", the braque du Bourbonnais is sometimes born with a short tail (brachyury) or no tail at all (anury).
The gene responsible for this characteristic has been identified as being the same as the Brittany one, of autosomal dominant type.

Head position 
High or prolonging the shoulder.

Temperament 
They have  a good temper and can be a good agreement dog. But it is mostly a hunter. It is a continental dog, and must be judged as such.

Allure and style 
They show a lot of activity, even if he does not go very far. Their natural pace is gallop, but under cover he can use trot. They can change direction quickly, like polo.

Pointing 
They must point with authority, in a classical position.

See also
 Dogs portal
 List of dog breeds

References

External links 
 Full genealogy, standards, photos, drawings, and genetics of the breed

FCI breeds
Rare dog breeds
Gundogs
Pointers
Dog breeds originating in France